Antonio Visentini (21 November 1688 – 26 June 1782) was an Italian architectural designer, painter and engraver, known for his architectural fantasies and capricci, the author of treatises on perspective and a professor at the Venetian Academy.

Life and works
Born in Venice, Visentini was a pupil of the widely travelled Baroque painter Giovanni Antonio Pellegrini, who had painted some decors in English country houses at the beginning of the 18th century. Visentini is best known today as the engraver for Canaletto's first great series of Venetian vedute published under the title Urbis Venetiarum Prospectus Celebriores ex Antonii Canal, organised by British resident Joseph (Consul) Smith (1682–1770). The series was begun around 1728 and by the time it was completed in 1735, thirty-eight etchings and engravings had been printed.

On the Grand Canal, Visentini was commissioned to redesign the façade of the residence of Consul Smith, the Palazzo Balbi. He collaborated with Francesco Zuccarelli on capriccios based on English Palladian villas, again for Consul Smith; some have passed with Smith's collection to the British Royal Collection. In Vicenza, Visentini painted frescoes at the Villa Valmarana, for which Gian Domenico Tiepolo painted the figures. In the 1760s the English architect James Wyatt studied with him as an architectural draughtsman and painter.

Visentini's work, the Osservazioni, published in Venice in 1771, was intended as a complement and an extension of a treatise by Teofilo Gallacini (1564–1641), which concerned itself with the errors of Mannerist and early Baroque architecture.  Visentini's engravings in the Osservazioni illustrate his proposed modifications correcting Baroque architectural details.

Visentini taught at the Accademia di Belle Arti in Venice from 1772–78, and he died in Venice in 1782.

Gallery

Notes

References
Delneri, Annalia (1988). "Antonio Visentini: 1688–1782," in Capricci veneziani del Settecento a cura di Dario Succi (Torino: Umberto Allemandi).
Lazzaro, Claudia (1981). Eighteenth-Century Italian Prints. (Stanford).
Links, J.G. (1977). Canaletto and his Patrons, Paul Elek Ltd, London. p. 97–98.
Succi, D., ed (1986). Canaletto & Visentini, Venezia & Londra: catalogo della mostra alla Galleria d’arte Moderna di Cà Pesaro. Edition Bertoncello–Tedeschi: Venezia.

External links

Web Gallery of Art: Antonio Visentini 
Visentini, Antonio. Osservazioni di Antonio Visentini, architetto veneto, che servono di continuazione al trattato di Teofilo Gallacini sopra gli errori degli architetti. Giambatista Pasquali: Venice, 1771.  
Biographical sketch of Antonio Visentini in: Pellegrino, Antonio Orlandi. Abecedario pittorico del m.r.p. Pellegrino Antonio Orlandi, bolognese, contenente le notizie de' professori di pittura, scoltura, ed architettura. Giambatista Pasquali: Venice, 1753. 
 Vat.lat.8482, Antonio Maria Visentini L'introductione Della soda e reale Architettura, e Prospetiva di Antonio Visentini, Veneto (c. 1764) 

1688 births
1782 deaths
18th-century Italian architects
17th-century Italian painters
Italian male painters
18th-century Italian painters
Italian vedutisti
Academic staff of the Accademia di Belle Arti di Venezia
Architects from Venice
18th-century Italian male artists